The Minister of State in the Deputy Prime Minister's Office is a non-cabinet ministerial position in the government of Zimbabwe. There are two incumbents: Gibson Sibanda and Sekai Holland. The duties of the position have yet to be publicly defined.

References

Government of Zimbabwe